Nick King (born August 5, 1995) is an American professional basketball player for New Taipei CTBC DEA of the T1 League.  He played college basketball for Memphis, Alabama and Middle Tennessee State.

College career
King began his collegiate career at Memphis, where he averaged 5.9 points per game in two seasons. He transferred to Alabama, where he only suited up for seven games due to a lung infection. After his junior season at Alabama, King transferred again to Middle Tennessee State. In his senior season at Middle Tennessee State, King averaged 21.2 points and 8.4 rebounds per contest. He led the Blue Raiders to a regular season conference title and was named Conference USA Player of the Year and Newcomer of the Year. King set the single season school record for points.

Professional career
After going undrafted in the 2018 NBA draft, King signed with the Los Angeles Lakers in the NBA Summer League. In 10 summer league games for the Lakers, King averaged 8.6 points and 4.7 rebounds per game. In September 2018, King signed a training camp deal with the Boston Celtics. On October 9, 2018, King was waived by the Celtics. He was signed by the Celtics' G League affiliate, the Maine Red Claws.

King signed with Philippines-based club San Miguel Alab Pilipinas, which plays in the ASEAN Basketball League, replacing Renaldo Balkman. In 16 games, he averaged 19.9 points, 8.5 rebounds, 3.8 assists and 1.1 steals per game. On October 23, 2020, King signed with Trigrillos de Antioquia of the Baloncesto Profesional Colombiano. In his debut, he had 39 points and seven rebounds in a win against Sabio, earning player of the week honors.

On February 14, 2021, King signed with ZZ Leiden of the Dutch Basketball League (DBL). He won the 2020–21 DBL championship with Leiden.

On August 6, 2021, King signed a one-year contract with Orlandina Basket in Italy.

Windy City Bulls (2022–2023)
On October 23, 2022, King joined the Windy City Bulls training camp roster. On January 13, 2023, King was waived.

New Taipei CTBC DEA (2023–present)
On January 30, 2023, King signed with New Taipei CTBC DEA of the T1 League.

References

External links
Middle Tennessee Blue Raiders bio

1995 births
Living people
American expatriate basketball people in Colombia
American expatriate basketball people in the Philippines
American men's basketball players
Basketball players from Memphis, Tennessee
B.S. Leiden players
Dutch Basketball League players
Maine Red Claws players
Memphis Tigers men's basketball players
Alabama Crimson Tide men's basketball players
Middle Tennessee Blue Raiders men's basketball players
Parade High School All-Americans (boys' basketball)
Power forwards (basketball)
San Miguel Alab Pilipinas players
Small forwards
New Taipei CTBC DEA players
T1 League imports